is a 1970 Japanese drama film directed by Kihachi Okamoto.

It is the 20th of a series of films featuring the blind swordsman Zatoichi. The main character is based on a fictional character, a blind masseur and swordmaster. He was created by novelist Kan Shimozawa and set during the late Edo period (1830s and 1840s).

In this film, actor Toshiro Mifune plays a similar character to Sanjuro, the rōnin (masterless samurai) in Akira Kurosawa's famous film Yojimbo (1961).  Although Mifune is clearly not playing the same man (his name here is Daisaku Sasa, and his personality and background differ in many key respects), the film's title and some of its content connect him to the character, the Ronin with No Name, and the idea of the two iconic jidaigeki characters confronting each other (Machibuse, made in the same year, also stars Mifune in a role similar to that of Yojimbo).

Plot
In the middle of a rainstorm, Ichi overhears a man being killed by a group and then dragged off into the brush. Tired of wandering, he decides to visit his hometown not noticing until later that the townspeople are living in fear of a local yakuza gang. At a teahouse, he meets Umeno, a former love interest. In the meantime, the boss's eldest son returns from university expecting a large sum of money to be paid to him, but the boss refuses. The youngest son, who also wants the money, hires Yojimbo (Toshiro Mifune) to assassinate him, as he is the boss's top enforcer. Yojimbo, however, is more than happy to bide his time drinking and making him wait.

Eventually, another rōnin armed with a double-barreled pistol wanders into town, wanting the bounty on Zatoichi's head. While Zatoichi makes short work of him, eventually the boy grows tired of his father's apparent unwillingness to hand over the gold and begins to build an army to combat him. Caught up in the middle of the conflict, Zatoichi battles both sides until everyone falls dead. Taking his opportunity, Yojimbo catches the weary Zatoichi and fights a quick duel, which ends in a draw when he slices him across the back and Zatoichi in return stabs him in the thigh.

Cast 
 Shintaro Katsu − Zatoichi
 Toshiro Mifune - 'Yojimbo' Daisaku Sasa
 Ayako Wakao − Umeno
 Osamu Takizawa − Yasuke Eboshiya
 Masakane Yonekura − Boss Masagoro
 Minori Terada - Yogo
 Toshio Hosokawa - Goto Sanzaemon
 Shin Kishida − Kuzuryu
 Kanjūrō Arashi - Hyoroku

Production
 Yoshinobu Nishioka - Art direction

References

External links 

1970 drama films
1970 films
1970s Japanese-language films
Japanese crossover films
Films scored by Akira Ifukube
Films directed by Kihachi Okamoto
Japanese drama films
1970s Japanese films